The 2002 Sarasota Clay Court Classic was a women's tennis event played on outdoor green clay courts in Sarasota, Florida in the United States that was part of the Tier IV category on the 2002 WTA Tour. It was the inaugural edition of the tournament and was held from April 1 through April 7, 2002. First-seeded Jelena Dokić won the singles title.

Finals

Singles
 Jelena Dokić defeated  Tatiana Panova, 6–2, 6–2
 It was Dokić' 1st singles title of the year and the 4th of her career.

Doubles
 Liezel Huber /   Elena Likhovtseva defeated  Els Callens  /  Conchita Martínez, 6–7(5–7), 6–3, 6–3

External links
 WTA tournament draws
 ITF tournament edition details

2002 WTA Tour
2002 in American tennis
Tennis tournaments in Florida
Sports in Sarasota, Florida
2002 in sports in Florida